Madonna has been known for her philanthropic endeavors, activism and political commentaries. She began as one of the first musicians to advocate in response to the HIV/AIDS epidemic in the 1980s. Throughout her career, Madonna has advocated and supporting different causes including human rights (such as women's and LGBT rights), education and child welfare. She has used her social media channels to motivate her followers and raise awareness about various social concerns. Since her early career, Madonna has defined that with her fame comes the responsibility to be a spokesperson.

She has donated time and money in sizeable quantities to numerous charitable organizations, and sometimes made it as a quiet donor. Her endeavors also include performing in various benefit concerts or participating in different charity records. Madonna founded her own charitable organizations in 1998 (Ray of Light Foundation) and 2006 (Raising Malawi). The first serves areas all over the world, while the second focuses their efforts on Malawi. 

Her activism is also known for her "outrage" views, bold statements, and her occasionally provocative tones and supporting manner, which have garnered her criticism. A generational gap on politically correct perceptions have also disfavored some of her messages. For a period, her humanitarian efforts in Malawi were polarized by a series of events, including the adoptions she made and a fund mismanagement of an abandoned project attributed to her then-board members. Following the unsuccessful project, she hired the consulting firm Global Philanthropy Group, and was welcomed by various from the philanthropy sector for her continued commitment to help. Despite the all sorts of criticism she has encountered, various have appreciated her endeavors describing her views as "outspoken" and "candorous" while maintaining a view of Madonna as a person who is "firm in her convictions" about social injustices despite any backlash or treatment directed at her persona and popularity. At the height of her fame, reviewers from academic Douglas Kellner to journalist Matt Cain have remarked on how she helped bring various social concerns into the mainstream in her generation. Others have emphasized and underlined Madonna's effect on subsequent generations of musicians in various ways.

Named a "Goodwill Ambassador for Child Welfare" by Malawian president Peter Mutharika, her charitable efforts have been recognized in some ceremony awards, including the AIDS Project Los Angeles (APLA) and American Foundation for AIDS Research (amfAR) by her help in the AIDS crisis.

Noteworthy charity supports
Madonna's philanthropic endeavors include different causes. In Women Icons of Popular Music (2009), Carrie Havranek comments that "she downplays much of [...] her philanthropic efforts, despite the fact that she is a regular donor to AIDS charities and a quiet donor to a charity for breast cancer". Conversely, after the advent of social media, Sarah Ezzy from Global Philanthropy Group, commented "she's not shy about using her social media to highlight her giving and encourage others to give directly to those efforts". Mel Ottenberg from Interview said "Madonna does so much charitable work".

Selected fundraising and charity on AIDS and LGBT causes

The biographer Carol Gnojewski said she has "donated millions" to AIDS organizations. Writing for Billboard in 2001, Wayne Hoffman commented that her AIDS charity involves "money and time". She is considered to be one of the first musicians to advocate in response to the AIDS crisis, or one of the first "notable names" from the entertainment industry in the cause.

Madonna raised money for AIDS causes through many of her projects. In her first international tour, Who's That Girl World Tour (1987), she raised $400,000 for amfAR with a Madison Square Garden concert. It became one of the first AIDS benefits given by a celebrity according to Out, and Rolling Stone labeled Madonna as the "first major American pop star" to stage such a large-scale fund-raiser. She also donated to the French Association of Artists Against AIDS from her Paris concert. She continued donating with her Blond Ambition World Tour. Madonna also donated to AIDS Project Los Angeles, the AIDS Action Foundation, and amfAR after the premiere of Truth or Dare. Madonna took part in Elizabeth Taylor's 65th birthday in 1997, considered by Guinness World Records to be the most money raised by a birthday fundraiser.

Madonna became a patron of Crusaid in 2002, donating signed items to raise money. In 2007, she donated to the Mobilization Against AIDS. She auctioned a private concert in 2008, raising more than $560,000 for amfAR at the 61th Cannes Film Festival's Cinema Against AIDS. Madonna bestowed Jeremy Scott with the Award of Courage at the amfAR Gala in Los Angeles in November 2021, contributing also to the fundraising efforts. That year, Madonna helped raise $100,000 for LGBTQ+ organizations during a Pride party at the Standard Hotels of New York. She premiered a Pride-themed video installation titled No Fear, Courage, Resist, which was screened on displays in Times Square the same day.

She offered moral and financial support to her HIV/AIDS-affected friends, including artist Keith Haring. She had attended a fashion fundraiser event by November 1986, and a benefit dance marathon in 1989 with her friend and mentor, Christopher Flynn also diagnosed with the disease. Madonna endorsed other groups including ACT UP and Bid 2 Beat AIDS. Madonna has remembered World AIDS Days multiple times; during the 2015 Rebel Heart Tour she dedicated a performance and speech honoring survivors and victims. She participated in "Sing", a song released during the World AIDS Day in 2007. Madonna allowed her B-side song "Supernatural" to appear in the AIDS charity album Red Hot + Dance (1992), with a remix provided by Sly and Robbie.

Education and child welfare
Her efforts have significantly focused on child welfare and education over the years, primarily through her charitable organizations. The Ray of Light Foundation, established in 1998, has supported the education of girls in Afghanistan, Pakistan, and other countries, and in Malawi through Raising Malawi which started in 2006.

Outside of her own charitable organizations, she has donated money and time to these causes. She attended Sport Aid's Race Against Time in 1988, designed for children's charities, stating: "Saving the world from hunger and disease is a tall order, but saving a child from starvation or the measles is possible". By February 1987, the Make-A-Wish Foundation had arranged a meeting between Madonna and a young leukemia patient, then 9 years old. A week prior, a spokesman for Warner Records stated she had "done similar things in the past", but without publicity. In early 2003, Madonna kept in touch with a 17-year-old girl with liver cancer through her final days via the Children's Wish Foundation of Canada. She has made visits to orphanages, and through the years, Madonna has been reported to have taken all her children on trips to do charitable work, particularly in Malawi. After her stop on the 2016 Rebel Heart Tour in Philippines, she visited the Bahay Tuluyan Foundation, a center that provides shelter for orphans and street children and also the Hospicio de San Jose. That year, she visited Kenya in Africa.

Madonna is a patron of the UK-based charity Children of Peace. She was part of the organizational committee at a 2009 Raisa Gorbachev Foundation charity gala. That year, she donated a personal Dior shoes to benefit Gypsy child education in Romania, and also made a donation in 2007, to an organization that sets up playgrounds in Russia.

According to Mary Cross, in Madonna: A Biography (2007), she has reportedly donated $21 million to the establishment of Spirituality for Kids, in Los Angeles, a Kabbalah school and an organization that works for schools and young community centers to help children develop into "strong, clear, happy human beings". According to Lucy O'Brien in Madonna: Like an Icon, she donated "all her profits from her children's books to the foundation". By other estimates, she donated about $22 million for the establishment of the Kabbalist Grammar School For Children (a.k.a The K School) in New York City; a source claimed one of her motivations was because "education means a lot to her".

Responses to some humanitarian crisis

Madonna made monetary responses to a number of crisis and disasters. She became one of the first recording artists to make a donation to charities helping the victims of the World Trade Center and Pentagon attacks in September 2001. She granted $1 million from the proceeds of three Los Angeles concerts of her Drowned World Tour to children orphaned by the disaster. Helen Studd, a correspondent for the Irish Independent reported about her immediate response: "Her generosity has started a wave of contributions from designers and pop bands".

She also responded to the extreme earthquakes that occurred in 2009 in Pacentro, Italy with $500,000 and at least $250,000 for the 2010 Haiti earthquake, through Partners in Health. As part of her fundraising efforts for Hurricane Sandy victims, Madonna exposed her buttocks during a MDNA Tour concert to encourage her audience to throw money at the stage. She visited victims in Queens, New York and by 2013 it was announced she would donate clothing used in that tour to raise money. The following year, in 2014, Madonna responded to the Flint water crisis with a monetary donation granted to Community Foundation of Greater Flint. According to some reports, Madonna helped raise $5.5 million to support people affected by the 2015 Malawi flood crisis.

Shortly after the Christchurch mosque shootings in New Zealand in 2019, Madonna donated $10,000 to GoFundMe as part of a goal to raise $100,000. It was reported that she donated about $1.1 million toward the development of a COVID-19 vaccine in 2020, to Bill & Melinda Gates Foundation. She also donated, in association with the Reform Alliance 100,000 masks to prisons and jails across the country.

Benefit concerts, charity events and other causes

Madonna joined various benefit concerts, including Live Aid (1985), Live 8 (2005) and Live Earth (2007). She headlined the London concert of the lattermost event, and wrote "Hey You" for their campaign. Initially released as a free downloadable track, within these terms the song was available on MSN.com, and for each of the first one million free downloads, $0.25 cents were announced to be donated to the Alliance for Climate Protection.

Madonna participated in the 1998 concert for the Rainforest Foundation Fund to support indigenous people and rainforests. According to the Guinness World Records, it was the largest environmental fundraising event held. Madonna's song "Freedom" had previously appeared on their charity album Carnival! The Rainforest Foundation in 1997.

Madonna participated in the Tsunami Aid, to raise money for the victims of the 2004 Indian Ocean earthquake and tsunami by performing a cover of "Imagine". She invited her audience through her official website to donate the red cross. The next year, Madonna joined the BBC telethon, Children in Need 2005. In 2010, Madonna performed at the Hope for Haiti Now with the song "Like a Prayer".

Aside from benefit concerts, she has been part of various charity records. In 1987, she contributed a cover of "Santa Baby" to the series' first charity album, A Very Special Christmas to benefit the Special Olympics. In 2004, Madonna introduced the Band Aid 20 video of the charity supergroup, Band Aid. She was part of the 2011 soundtrack Every Mother Counts from documentary No Woman, No Cry.

She participated at a 1993 The Arsenio Hall Show to benefit Magic Johnson Foundation, and in 1995 she presented a plaque to Muhammed Ali from Parkinson's Disease Foundation. In 1997, assisted to a fund-raising gala honoring Gianni Versace. In 2013, Madonna gave a speech at the Chime for Change concert to benefit education, health and justice. In 2017, Madonna made a surprise performance at the Leonardo DiCaprio Foundation's annual charity auction, helping raise money for the cause as well. Over the years, she donated more than $8 million to the Kabbalah Centre in London. Vegetarian Times reported that with her first international tour, Who's That Girl? in 1987, she donated a portion of the receipts from each concert to charities; aside from AIDS causes, she gave money to a charity in Chicago that refurbishes playgrounds with new equipment and soft ground surfaces.

Activism and advocacy
Madonna has spoken out in favor of and on behalf of numerous groups and individuals, through statements or works (songs, videos, or concerts). By the early 1990s, academic Douglas Kellner in Oh Fashion (1994), describes her as becoming "political" making "statements on behalf of AIDS victims, the homeless, saving the rain forests, and women's rights". Decades later, in 2020, Bianca Gracie from Spin magazine stated "she's continuously shown advocacy for social injustices". The author Nikolay Anguelov, comments that she is "known for her humanitarian efforts in developing countries and support for environmental and social causes".

Rebecca Gulick noted in her Madonna biography published in 1993, "Madonna believes that with her fame comes the responsibility to be a spokesperson". Author Jennifer Egan recalls one of Madonna's early professional goals by saying: "I know I'm not the best singer, and I know I'm not the best dancer. But I'm not interested in that" but in being "political". She maintained her beliefs, and by 2017, proclaimed "I have to get way more vocal" while even feeling that the entertainment industry should be "more political", noting in her view, that many remain neutral in order to maintain their "popularity". She made similar remarks in 2019, claiming "I'm not here to be popular. I'm here to be free" which Jon Pareles from The New York Times regarded as part of her self-described "political voice".

Selected examples

In 2013, she released the short film secretprojectrevolution, which deals with human rights and was part of a campaign to raise money for those causes. Madonna voiced her disapproval to the Romani discrimination in Eastern Europe during her Sticky & Sweet Tour concert in Romania. It was reported that her statements were negatively received by the crowd, but she found support from the Hindu and Jewish communities.

She supported and advocated for other activists. Madonna supported Pussy Riot during their trial for their protest and criticism to Vladimir Putin. She stated on stage during her MDNA Tour: "Everyone has the right to free speech, everywhere in the world". Two years later, Madonna introduced two of their members, Masha and Nadya at the 2014 Amnesty International's Bringing Human Rights Home, stating: "I am honored to introduce my fellow freedom fighters Masha and Nadya from Pussy Riot. I have admired their courage and have long supported their commitment and the sacrifices they have made in the name of freedom of expression and human rights". She donated 600 tickets for her MDNA Tour show in Tel Aviv Israeli and Palestinian peace camp activists, including Peace Now's founder Yariv Oppenheimer and Ron Pundak. She raised her voice to urge the release of Greenpeace activists jailed in 2013 in Russia.

In the early 2015, Madonna raised her voice against the Baga massacre in Nigeria. During her Rebel Heart Tour that year, Madonna paid tribute to the victims of the Paris attacks by Islamists, and gave an impromptu performance at Place de la République singing acoustic versions of her songs "Ghosttown", "Like a Prayer", and a cover of John Lennon's "Imagine". Christopher Bergland, said of the performance, "the fact one of the most famous people in the world, has the balls to sing... publicly on a street corner in Paris... should be inspiration to all of us to keep doing what we love to do".

She joined the Black Lives Matter movement, posting numerous threads, and she also encouraged her followers to donate to the George Floyd Memorial Fund. She later took the opportunity to assist in a London protest in June 2020. Commenting about her attendance, Amy Mackelden, an editor of Harper's Bazaar said she "was ... instantly recognizable" and "her support of the protest seemed to buoy the spirits of fellow protestors". Madonna shared a photo of the 2019 Amazon rainforest wildfires along with a caption. By 2022, Madonna had joined the digital campaign led by Global Citizen called "Stand Up for Ukraine", which appealed for donations and other forms of support to those affected by the Russo-Ukrainian War. She invited her audience to support the cause and posted a link to Global Citizen article "9 Meaningful Ways You Can Help Ukraine". She also shared a cover of "Your Song" in the style of a "living room season".

Music and arts
Madonna has supported the Sweet Relief Musicians Fund. She donated items in 1999, and recorded the song "Guilty By Association" featured in their charity album Sweet Relief II: Gravity of the Situation (1997). It's an alt-country recorded with her brother-in-law Joe Henry.

Madonna has used the arts to support other artists, or as a charitable activity. She has supported other industry colleagues and in this regard, Daniel Neira from celebrity magazine ¡Hola! summed up "Madonna is known for being a supportive friend" and is "constantly showing support". She joined the #FreeBritney movement. She defended the idea at a New Music Seminar conference held in 1984 when it was a new notion that some did not accept in juxtaposing actor-musician roles in music videos. In 2005, Madonna joined the National Association of Broadcasters' campaign "Radio: You Hear It Here First" to promote terrestrial radio. She also joined a campaign against music piracy around these years.

Gun control

Before  beginning with her advocacy, Madonna raised controversy during the MDNA Tour, because she used fake firearms which she defended as "artistic" bringing the examples of action movies. Shortly years after, Madonna talked about gun control rights in several opportunities, calling it "the biggest problem in America right now" by 2019.

Among her many posts regarding concerns with school shootings and gun control, she expressed that she felt a "responsibility to the children of the world". By April 2021, Madonna had invited her audience to join the campaign of Everytown for Gun Safety, and she was later seen posting wheat paste stickers with messages about gun control on Los Angeles streets. Various people noted her efforts, including actor Peter Stickles. In May 2022, she shared a lengthy post after the Texas shooting at the Robb Elementary School demanding a "Gun Reform" from lawmakers, calling out to the National Rifle Association.

Madonna released the video "God Control" from her 2019 album Madame X, which deals largely with the issue but earned controversy for its depiction of violence. Others thanked the intention, with an editor from Attitude recalling the video's caption, "it's happening every day. And it has to stop", as well as its affiliation with a number of groups, including Everytown for Gun Safety, March for Our Lives Action Fund, Gays Against Guns and Human Rights Campaign. Ruth M. Glenn, president and CEO of the National Coalition Against Domestic Violence was pleased about Madonna's mention and support. Gun activists like Shannon Watts felt grateful that artists like Madonna were participating to spread awareness.

Political 

According to Lucy O'Brien, Madonna inherited the sense of justice and inclusive politics from her Italian paternal grandfather Gaetano Ciccone, who assisted in organizing a brief but "crippling strike" at the Aliquippa mill in the summer of 1937 which resulted in an improvement in the lives of the workers. She wrote an article to the inaugural issue of political-targeted magazine George in 1995. She participated in the first Rock the Vote campaign in 1990 to encourage young audiences to practice the suffrage. Mentioning Madonna's video, Liana Satenstein from Vogue commented that the campaign's videos of the 1990s are "special". In 1996, MTV's "Choose or Lose" used the Madonna video again.

Madonna voiced her concern about George W. Bush foreign policy with the invasion of Iraq. By 2004, she commented: "There's global terror everywhere and it's absurd to think you can get it by going to one country and dropping tons of bombs on innocent people". She also called Nicolás Maduro a fascist. But while Madonna criticized some politicians, she received responses from some of them or their representatives. She was notoriously "attacked" by Russian politicians for her gay rights advocacy and support for Pussy Riot. Madonna also received "criticism and threats" from the National Rally party in France when she denounced the rise of xenophobia and extreme-right movements in France and Europe, and for her critics to Marine Le Pen.

She openly supports the Democratic Party in her home country. Madonna has expressed her support for presidential contenders or presidents such as Bill Clinton, Barack Obama, Joe Biden and Hillary Clinton, while also encouraging her audience to practice the vote. During her support of Hillary Clinton's presidential campaign in 2016, she held a surprise concert at Washington Square Park in New York on the final day of US election campaign, which The Guardians Emma-Lee Moss described as an "astonishing concert". It was streamed live on Facebook. She also "famously" promised oral sex to Hillary voters.

Ray of Light Foundation

Raising Malawi

Madonna and Michael Berg founded Raising Malawi in 2006. The organization have supported numerous charitable initiatives. Professor Chris Rojek at Brunel University wrote in Fame Attack (2012), "Madonna matches every dollar raised through corporate, community and academic support".

In 2006, she donated $1 million to build a compound that, as of 2011, fed over 1,500 orphans. Many of the children were cared for by Consol Homes Orphan Care, an organization Madonna assisted in the constructing of a power grid that provided electricity at the orphan care center. She also donated $1.5 million to the Millennium Villages Project (MVP) and accompanied its founder, Jeffrey Sachs on a trip to Malawi. Madonna reportedly donated $11 million of her own money and raised a total of $18 million to build a school in Malawi. People magazine informed in 2018, that the organization had assisted in the construction of ten schools.

Madonna has orchestrated fundraising efforts for Raising Malawi; for example through a sale of personal belongings and other dynamics, she garnered over $7.5 million in a one-time Miami show of the Madonna: Tears of a Clown in 2016. By the next year, in 2017 the foundation opened up the Mercy James Institute for Pediatric Surgery and Intensive Care, named after Madonna's adopted Malawian children. It became the first children's hospital in the country. According to Trevor Neilson from Global Philanthropy Group, she is the largest individual donor to the hospital and funds programs run by Eric Borgstein at Queen Elizabeth Central Hospital.

Madonna also made a documentary on Malawi's plight, I Am Because We Are (2008), which she wrote, narrated and produced. It was accompanied by the publication of a book featuring Kristen Ashburn's photographs, and author proceeds from the sale of the book was reported to be donated to the foundation.

Michael Berg and Kabbalah Centre controversy 
Raising Malawi and Madonna became the subject of "headlines around the world" as a result of an abandoned project to construct a school worth over $15 million, and with a stated number of $3.8 million lost in the effort guaranteed. The speculation for the collapse, was turned to the Kabbalah Centre and Michael Berg (son of the centre's founder and co-founder of Raising Malawi), and without making mention of Madonna's name, the Centre and Berg were subjected to an audit. Madonna relocated her charity's offices away from Kabbalah's headquarters, and removed her advisers linked to the centre from her board members. She earlier declared that they were included because she believed in the "spiritual side".

Meanwhile, Madonna hired consulting firm Global Philanthropy Group to manage its operations that still working together, and with buildOn they were able to aid Raising Malawi with a new path, which included the development of smaller schools.  Global Philanthropy Group's founder, Trevor Neilson expressed his admiration for her resilience and commitment to helping others. "Madonna's philanthropic adventure went awry, but there is no reason to doubt her intentions and generosity", the editors of Reimagining Global Philanthropy (2021), said. In a dedicated piece on the issue, Harvard Business Review remined readers that in philanthropy, failure is an almost daily occurrence".

Madonna previously faced criticism for embracing Kabbalah studies because she blended her spiritual belief with life and also charitable efforts, while the spiritual branch itself was labeled as a "money-driven cult". UNICEF faced some of these criticisms during a Madonna-hosted fundraising event in 2008, which many said was also used to "promote" the Kabbalah Centre. The proceeds for the events, were reported to be divided between UNICEF and Raising Malawi.

Reactions

Controversies and criticisms

A number of Madonna's commentaries, particularly those with suggestive undertones, have garnered her criticism. Others objected to the direction of her efforts; Kat Stoeffel of The Cut, for example, was scathing about her supporting manner for activist Malala Yousafzai and her politically charged agenda in 2012 during the MDNA Tour. Veterans of Foreign Wars criticized Madonna for wearing an American flag in her Rock the Vote video of 1990. Her publicist responded, "she's trying to get that message across in a humorous, dramatic way. But she's very serious about the issue". While referring to her "politically incorrect" occurrences, the staff of Los Andes stated they brought her fame and were viewed as "revolutionary" by many but not by others. Professor Pamela Robertson claims in Guilty pleasures: feminist camp from Mae West to Madonna (1996), that "Madonna's politics are empty of content" and are "vague" for many reviewers. Editors Adam Geczy and Vicki Karaminas had conflicting opinions, stating that her "political activism" provides "disenfranchised groups with empowering identifications" but they also categorized it as cultural industry.

During her speech at the 2017 Women's March, Madonna drawn controversy after saying the word "fuck you" three times, and also for declaring: "Yes I have thought an awful lot about blowing up the White House, but I know that this won’t change anything. We cannot fall into despair" as a critic to Trump administration (the reason of the march). Madonna's comments sparked outrage among Trump staffers. Madonna defended later of backlash, by saying that she was speaking metaphorically, and shared two ways of looking at things: To be hopeful and feel anger and outrage. The Sacramento Bee also explored how others found inspirations in her speech. Her decision to perform at the Eurovision Song Contest 2019 drew backlash from Palestinian activists, scholars, and intellectuals ranging from PACBI to BDS. Her message and performance received a polarized reception from viewers. One of the most criticized moves in her career, Middle East Monitor ranked her second, behind a Mariah Carey's concert in Saudi Arabi in their list of "10 artists hit by human rights criticism over concerts". Madonna explained her decision and message by stating:

I'll never stop playing music to suit someone's political agenda nor will I stop speaking out against violations of human rights wherever in the world they may be [...] My heart breaks every time I hear about the innocent lives that are lost in this region and the violence that is so often perpetuated to suit the political goals of people who benefit from this ancient conflict.

Bette Midler introduced Madonna to the global audience of the Live Aid in 1985, referring her as a "woman who pulled herself up by her bra straps and has been known to let them down occasionally". According to media, it was a reference of the Madonna's pre-fame nude photos that Playboy and Penthouse ran weeks earlier. Nicole Hensley of New York Daily News commented, "The Material Girl has a history of pushing sexually suggestive motifs to encourage young people to complete their civic duty". Madonna's sexual image, as well as her affiliation and activism for the LGBT community and the AIDS epidemic, caused "many people" including her then-husband Sean Penn, to believe she was HIV-positive herself. She addressed the allegations at an AIDS research gala in 1991 by saying: "I'm not HIV-positive but what if I were? I would be more afraid of how society would treat me for having the disease than the actual disease itself [...] If this is what I have to deal with for my involvement in fighting this epidemic, then so be it". Rolling Stone commented her contributions to the AIDS causes were relatively overlooked by her marriage with Penn.

In the era of social media, a confluence of factors polarized some of her messages. As Roger Friedman says after citing her Instagram post regarding the COVID-19 lockdowns during a so-called misinformation era, "it's easy to make fun of Madonna [...] But kudos and thanks for the Gates contribution". In another scenario, The Advocates Neal Broverman recalls a post about gun control in April 2021 that received "mixed" reactions from her followers, with one user calling her an "out-of-touch millionaire who has no right to an opinion on the matter". Madonna responded to the user justifying her statement.

Some criticism of Madonna as a philanthropic agent and activist, stemmed from generalized perspectives such as the white savior—complex, or the fact Western celebrities help developing countries. CNN journalist Andrew Mwenda, was a critic of the lattermost point. While mentioned various celebrities, including Madonna, Cynthia Reynodls of Maclean's, said "celebrities are fickle, and so are trends, even among good causes".

Appreciation and recognition

In general, James Perone, a music professor at the University of Mount Union says she has had a "successful career" as a social and political activist, and professor Chris Rojek similarly claims, she has been "celebrated" as a "major celebrity humanitarian" to many.

Author and lawyer Ian Rosenberg described her philanthropic endeavors, and her sometimes shocking messages, as a "trademark" with a blend of provocation but also "candor". The editor of Musicians and Composers of the 20th Century (2009) believes that despite criticism, she has "remained firm in her convictions", and Hilary Weaver from Vanity Fair comments that she "has never been one to back down from taking a political stand—despite the criticism that might follow". Rodrigo Fresán quotes Madonna as saying that there are people "who hate me" for having an opinion on things. For Lucy O'Brien, "she risks unpopularity" and her style is "confrontational". Brittany Spanos, editor of Rolling Stone referred she "has always been forthright about her political opinions".

Her early activism in the 1980s and 1990s, was appreciated by many. This is seen in Mark Bego's book Pop Culture Presents the Story Of Jewel (1998), where the author states: "Madonna paved the way in just so many ways. She was never afraid to break down taboos". In 2014, Christopher Rosa from VH1 stated that many celebrities endorse now-popular opinions of some matters that it can "proudly express themselves without general fear of judgment", but he believed she was advocating for the same rights in a period when were relatively "unpopular", claims. In Popular Culture and the Civic Imagination (2020), professors notes she is a self-proclaimed "Unapologetic Bitch", but uses her voice directly and forcefully to shock and therefore draw attention to her message. In short, they conclude Madonna paved the way for other generation of artists both as musical or "political commentator". According to José Mariscal from La Razón her music and activism are more than a display of rebellion, as she has starred "battles" for women's or human rights. Juan José Roldán, writing for El Correo de Andalucía in 2020, was generally positive saying that "few" such as Madonna, have been so "brave" and "daring" in the face of repeated injustices.

"Madonna has never shied away from making bold statements with her work", said Alexander Kacala from Out by 2019. At the height of her popularity, Douglas Kellner felt she helped "bring marginal groups and concerns into the cultural mainstream". British journalist Matt Cain similarly states she helped "broke down social barriers" by connecting "diversity" by producing multiple works that has brought marginalized groups to the fore to her large audience. "Bringing people together to celebrate liberation, equality and diversity is an essential aspect of Madonna's worldwide view", writes biographer Carol Gnojewski. Christopher Bergland praised her long-standing support for many causes in a 2015 piece for Psychology Today. Pete Hamill referred to her as "the greatest artistic force of the AIDS generation" in his book Piecework (2009).

Awards
Her activism has been recognized in ceremonial awards, including distinctions from her charitable works in helping cure AIDS, by the AIDS Project Los Angeles (APLA) in 1990 and American Foundation for AIDS Research (amfAR) in 1991. In 2018, Madonna was honored by the High School of Performing Arts in Malaga (in Spanish: Escuela Superior de Artes Escénicas de Málaga, ESAEM) for her artistic career and social advocacy. The director Marisa Zafra reflecting, remarked "Madonna's intense fight for human rights and her defense for the poorest and most underprivileged". They also announced two scholarship for two young cared in her charitable organization, Raising Malawi. Madonna thanked them via message.

Madonna's adoptions and efforts in Malawi

Her efforts were somewhat overshadowed when she and her then husband Guy Ritchie adopted infant David Banda in 2006, with many accusing her of violating Malawian laws. It sparked conversations about international adoptions by celebrities, and drew a "significant amount of media and public attention". As a result of the "highly publicized" process, The Guardian dubbed Banda "the most famous baby in the world" in a 2006 article. Some Madonna critics speculated that she adopted the infant as "a publicity stunt". In comparison, she adopted more children, one in 2009, and two in 2017, and Madonna recalls about her process with David Banda: "Every newspaper said I kidnapped him [...] In my mind, I was thinking 'Wait a minute. I'm trying to save somebody's life [...] I did everything by the book. That was a real low point for me. I would cry myself to sleep".

In 2008, researchers at the University of Liverpool coined the phrase "Madonna effect" to describe the international adoptions and their subversive effects. In the report, child psychologist Kevin Browne granted to the Madonna-style process, a closely rise in the number of children in orphanages across Europe, following adoptions made overseas rather than local. Researchers also stated that some parents in impoverished countries were handing up their children "in the belief that they will have a 'better life in the West'" with "a more wealthy family". When Madonna revealed her plans to adopt again in 2017, some activists were concerned that Madonna's act "would facilitate the child trafficking in Africa". By January 2023, Ethiopian World Federation accused Madonna of possible "human trafficking and social experiments", citing Madonna's public behavior and photos with his son Banda, who recreated a Madonna's outfit. The Federation asked Lazarus Chakwera, President of Malawi, to prevent "homosexual and transgender". 

A number of observers were generally complimentary or less alarming about Madonna's adoptions (mainly about Banda in 2006). It happened with Dave Levine of Showbiz Tonight (CNN), Mary Landers of the Savannah Morning News or singer and activist Bono among others. As both Madonna and Angelina Jolie were credited with popularizing celebrity adoptions in the early decade of the twenty-first century, various reviewers compared their philanthropic efforts because both received criticism. However, while researching "why was Madonna so criticized", author Keith Tester noted she attracted more critics than either Bob Geldof or Jolie. Professor Chris Rojek says Madonna and Jolie's adoptions "raise difficult questions" but he reacted generally positively.

Her activities in the country were once polarized as a result of a series of incidents, including her adoptions and the misappropriation of funds from the abandoned all-girl school attributed to her then-board members. Lisa Ann Richey explained in Celebrity Humanitarianism and North-South Relations (2015), that there are multiple "local" interpretations of Madonna's efforts, pointing out that some Malawians interpret Madonna as a "person who cynically exploit poor Africans to promote her own brand and who makes grand promises that never materialize" and others seen her as a "worthy humanitarian". Local elites in comparison, are viewed as "corrupt" or "self-serving". By contrast, Karin Wilkins writes in Communicating Gender and Advocating Accountability in Global Development (2016), that she has been referred "frequently" as "Saint Madonna of Malawi" or "a gift from heaven".

Joyce Banda minimized her efforts and criticized her persona during her presidency, though Madonna claimed that part of this government criticism was prompted by her dismissal of President Banda's sister Anjimile Oponyo who previously served in her charity organization but was removed after the mismanagement funds controversy. She was saddened by Banda's statements describing it as "inaccurate", but clarified it would not to interfere in her commitments. Banda's successors Peter Mutharika and Lazarus Chakwera praised her efforts. Mutharika even called her a "Goodwill Ambassador for Child Welfare" and a "symbol of a motherly spirit". The information minister, Patricia Kaliati was among of others that appreciated her endeavors.

See also
List of philanthropists
Criticism of Mother Teresa

References

Book sources

Further reading
The Atlantic (2004)
1 News (2023)
U.S. Fund for UNICEF (2016)
Small Steps Project
Climate Change Challenge

Madonna
Madonna